Sara Champion (11 November 1946 – 14 May 2000) was a British archaeologist with an interest in the European Iron Age and the role and visibility of women working in archaeology. She was editor of PAST, the newsletter of The Prehistoric Society from 1997 until her death in 2000. The Prehistoric Society hosts an annual Sara Champion Memorial Lecture.

Early life and education 
Champion was born Sara Hermon, the second of four children. The family lived in Kenya and Tanzania (Tanganyika at the time) for six years of her childhood. Champion later attended Benenden School. After Benenden, Champion attended the University of Edinburgh, where she studied for a master's degree in archaeology under Stuart Piggott. In 1968 Champion moved to St Hugh's College, Oxford, where she studied for a D.Phil. under the supervision of Christopher Hawkes concentrating on the Early European Iron Age.

Academic and archaeological work 
Champion undertook a two-year research fellowship in archaeology at Southampton University. She also lectured at the archaeology department there and taught on the Adult and Continuing Education courses. Champion also worked for English Heritage, overseeing the upkeep and preservation of the scheduled monuments of West Hampshire and Dorset. Champion recognised the potential of the internet for archaeology and she lectured and wrote articles on the application of internet resources in the teaching of archaeology, and electronic archaeology. Another area of research and interest was role the visibility of women in archaeology.

Six years after Champion's death a seminar room in the Crawford Building, the new building for the archaeology department at the university, was named in her honour.

Personal life 
Champion met Tim Champion (future President of the Royal Archaeological Institute and The Prehistoric Society) while studying at Oxford and they were married in 1970 at St Paul's Church in Knightsbridge. In 1972 the Champions moved to Southampton, where their two sons, Edward and William (the drummer of Coldplay), were born, in the mid 1970s, and 1978 respectively.

Champion's interests outside archaeology included music (she regularly djed at departmental and archaeological social gatherings) and she was a long-term member of the Southampton Philharmonic Choir.

Champion died of cancer in May 2000. The band Coldplay, of which her son Will is a member, dedicated their debut album Parachutes to her on its release in July 2000.

Selected publications 
1970 "The hillforts of the Cotteswold scarp, with special reference to recent excavations", Proceedings of the Cotteswold Naturalists' Field Club 36, 18-23
1971 "Excavations at Leckhampton Hill; 1969-70 interim report", Transactions of the Bristol & Gloucestershire Archaeological Society 90, 5-21 
1973 Andover - the archaeological implications of development Andover and District Excavation Committee
1976 "Leckhampton Hill, Gloucestershire - 1925 and 1970", in Hillforts: later prehistoric earthworks in Britain and Ireland, ed. D. W. Harding, 177-191
1980 A dictionary of terms and techniques in archaeology
1980 "Dendrochronology", Nature 284, 663-664
1995 "Archaeology and the internet", Field Archaeologist 24, 18-19
1997 "Special review section. Electronic archaeology", Antiquity 71, co-authored with Christopher Chippindale
1998 "Women in British archaeology. Visible and invisible," in Excavating women. A history of women in European archaeology, Andreu, M. Diaz and Sørensen, M.-L.S. (eds), London, 175–197.

Sara Champion Memorial Lectures
The Prehistoric Society's annual Sara Champion Memorial Lectures are held every October at the Society of Antiquaries lecture theatre in Burlington House, Piccadilly, London. The 10th annual lecture, due to be held in October 2010, was deferred and instead a debate was held to celebrate the 75th anniversary of the Prehistoric Society. The Sara Champion Debate had the topic "This House believes that the study of the Stone Ages has contributed more to our knowledge of the human condition than study of the Metal Ages" and was led by Clive Gamble and Tim Champion

The 2020-2021 lecture numbering system seems to have missed one out: the 20th Sara Champion Memorial Lecture.

References

1946 births
2000 deaths
British women archaeologists
British archaeologists
20th-century archaeologists